This page provides supplementary chemical data on 2-pyridone.

Analytical data

NMR spectroscopy

1H-NMR
1H-NMR (400 MHz, CD3OD): /ρ = 8.07 (dd,3J = 2.5 Hz,4J = 1.1 Hz, 1H, C-6), 7.98 (dd,3J = 4.0 Hz,3J = 2.0 Hz, 1H, C-3), 7.23 (dd,3J = 2.5 Hz,3J = 2.0 Hz, 1H, C-5), 7.21 (dd,3J = 4.0 Hz,4J = 1.0 Hz, 1H, C-4).

13C-NMR
(100.57 MHz, CD3OD): ρ = 155.9 (C-2), 140.8 (C-4), 138.3 (C-6), 125.8 (C-3), 124.4 (C-5)

UV/Vis spectroscopy
(MeOH):νmax (lg ε) = 226.2 (0.44), 297.6 (0.30).

IR spectroscopy
(KBr): ν = 3440 cm−1–1 (br, m), 3119 (m), 3072 (m), 2986 
(m), 1682 (s), 1649 (vs), 1609 (vs), 1578 (vs), 1540 (s), 1456 (m), 1433 (m), 1364 (w), 1243 (m), 1156 (m), 1098 (m), 983 (m), 926 (w), 781 (s), 730 (w), 612 (w), 560 (w), 554 (w), 526 (m), 476 (m), 451 (w).

Mass spectrometry
EI-MS (70 eV): m/z (%) = 95 (100) [M+], 67 (35) [M+ - CO], 51 (4)[C4H3+].

References

Pyridone, 2-
Chemical data pages cleanup